Matthew Dennis (born 11 February 1978) is a former Australian rules footballer who played with Hawthorn in the Australian Football League (AFL).

A defender, Dennis came to Hawthorn at pick 42 in the 1997 National Draft, from Old Brighton. He played two senior AFL games in 1998 and made three appearances in the 1999 season.

Dennis is a co-founder and CEO of the Melbourne-based company Made Group with category leading products NutrientWater and Cocobella Coconut water.

References

External links
 
 

1978 births
Living people
Australian rules footballers from Victoria (Australia)
Hawthorn Football Club players